Avgeio (Greek: Αυγείο, before 1955: Μπουχιώτη - Bouchioti) is a village in the northern part of the municipal unit of Amaliada, Elis, Greece. It is situated in a plain near the ancient city of Elis, 1 km southwest of Kalyvia, 2 km northeast of Sosti and 9 km north of Amaliada.

Population

External links
Avgeio, from the Amaliada municipal website (in Greek)
GTP - Avgeio

See also

List of settlements in Elis

References

Populated places in Elis